Zygogonium ericetorum is a species of alga belonging to the family Zygnemataceae.

It has cosmopolitan distribution.

References

Zygnemataceae